Drumbess is a townland between Cornafean and Killeshandra in County Cavan, Ireland. It is approximately one mile long by half a mile wide.

Townlands of County Cavan